Hotel Vier Jahreszeiten may refer to the following hotels in Germany:

 Hotel Vier Jahreszeiten (Hamburg)
 Hotel Vier Jahreszeiten (Munich)